Triple M Mackay & The Whitsundays (ACMA callsign: 4RGM) is an Australian radio station in Queensland. Owned and operated as part of Southern Cross Austereo's Triple M network, it broadcasts an adult contemporary format to Mackay, Queensland and the Whitsunday Islands. First broadcast on 21 September 1999, it was established by RG Capital – later sold to Macquarie Regional RadioWorks and Southern Cross Media Group – and is based in the Suncorp building on Victoria Street in Mackay, alongside sister station Hit Network.

Programming
 Jay & Dave for Breakfast (Celebrating close to 2500 shows. The longest running show in the region for 12 years). Jay Shipston formerly did breakfast with Angela Julian. Jay is now the longest hosting breakfast announcer (consecutive years) on Sea FM/Triple M Mackay.
 Mornings with Guy
 Alysha
 Marty Sheergold Show
 Nights with Dave Gleeson
 The Night Shift with Luke Bona (from Triple M Sydney)

References
 Various editions of Daily Mercury Newspaper (Mackay)

Radio stations in Queensland
Radio stations established in 1999
Adult contemporary radio stations in Australia
1999 establishments in Australia